This is the list of Asian Winter Games records in short-track speed skating, current after the 2017 Asian Winter Games.

Men

Women

References

1986 results
1990 results
1996 results
1999 results
2003 results

External links
OCA

Records
Short-track speed skating
Speed skating-related lists